The Horst-Schmidt-Kliniken in the district of Dotzheim is the largest hospital complex in Wiesbaden founding in 1879, owing to its affiliated institutions and 1,027 beds. In 1982 the new buildings were relocated to the present location.

External links 
 Official site of the Clinic 

Buildings and structures in Wiesbaden
Hospitals in Germany
Hospital buildings completed in 1982
Companies based in Wiesbaden
1982 establishments in West Germany
Medical and health organisations based in Hesse